The 2021 Ohio Valley Conference women's soccer tournament was the postseason women's soccer tournament for the Ohio Valley Conference held from October 29 through November 7, 2021. The first round and quarterfinals of the tournament were held at campus sites hosted by the #3 and #4 seeds, while the semifinals and final took place at Skyhawk Soccer Field in Martin, Tennessee. The eight-team single-elimination tournament consisted of four rounds based on seeding from regular season conference play. The SIU Edwardsville Cougars were the defending champions and successfully defended their crown by defeating top seeded UT Martin in the final. The conference tournament title was the fourth for the SIU Edwardsville women's soccer program, all of which have come under head coach Derek Burton. As tournament champions, SIU Edwardsville earned the Ohio Valley's automatic berth into the 2021 NCAA Division I Women's Soccer Tournament.

Seeding 

Eight of the nine teams in the Ohio Valley Conference qualified for the 2021 Tournament.  The #1 seed was awarded as the host institution for the Semifinals and Finals of the tournament.  The #1 and #2 seed received byes to the Semifinals, while the #4 and #5 seeds received byes to the Quarterfinals.  Seems were seeded based on regular season records, and a tiebreaker was required to determine the #1 and #2 seeds when UT Martin and SIU Edwardsville both finished with 6–2–0 regular season records.  UT Martin was awarded the #1 seed based on their 1–0 victory over SIU Edwardsville on October 10, during the regular season.  A second tiebreaker was required to determine the #6 and #7 seeds as Southeast Missouri State and Morehead State finished the regular season with 2–4–2 records.  The teams played to a 0–0 draw on October 17, during the regular season.  Morehead State was awarded the #6 seed by virtue of having a better record against the team's highest seeded common opponent, Tennessee Tech.  Morehead State defeated Tennessee Tech 1–0 while Southeast Missouri State drew 0–0.

Bracket

Source:

Schedule

First Round

Quarterfinals

Semifinals

Final

Statistics

Goalscorers

All-Tournament team

Source:

MVP in bold

References 

Ohio Valley Conference Women's Soccer Tournament
2021 Ohio Valley Conference women's soccer season